Vladlen David Zvenyach (born January 16, 1982) is a public servant, author, lawyer, and professor. He currently serves as a senior technical adviser to the General Services Administration, having previously served in a number of senior positions inside the federal government and D.C. government - including a stint as Executive Director of 18F. He resigned from his position as a senior technical adviser and Director of GSA's Technology Transformation Service on September 9, 2022. This occurred shortly before the release of an Inspector General Report that was highly critical of his conduct and decisions in that role. In his role at 18F, he pioneered a new method of government procurement. Zvenyach is also the author of Coding for Lawyers.

Career 
Zvenyach was a senior technical adviser to the General Services Administration. He previously served as the Acting Assistant Commissioner, Office of Systems Management, General Services Administration; Acting Executive Director, 18F; and the Assistant Commissioner of Acquisition for GSA's Technology Transformation Service. 18F is a model for "injecting the startup culture in the federal government," and Zvenyach helped it maintain senior-level support as the executive branch transitioned from the Obama to Trump administrations.

On March 7, 2023, after his resignation, the General Services Administration Office of the Inspector General released a highly critical report titled "GSA Misled Customers on Login.gov’s Compliance with Digital Identity Standard." According to the report, Zvenyach potentially misled General Services Administration senior leadership and other federal agencies on numerous occassions over a series of months, before declaring himself to be simply incompetent instead with the Inspector General noting:

"As the senior official over TTS and Login.gov, Zvenyach should have reviewed the standards to identify the implications of his decision to cease efforts to implement a selfie-check feature. Zvenyach was uniquely qualified to review those requirements with his prior GSA experience as the Executive Director overseeing Login.gov in 18F, and as an attorney trained in interpreting rules and requirements."

Prior to joining the federal government, Zvenyach served as General Counsel for the Council of the District of Columbia and Chief of Staff to Councilmember Mary Cheh. In D.C. government, Zvenyach was responsible for publishing the D.C. Code available online for free, in searchable format, and without any copyright restrictions.

Zvenyach was an adjunct faculty member with the George Washington University School of Law, teaching a class entitled Open Government Data, Law 6351. He holds a bachelor's degree from the University of Wisconsin at Madison and a law degree from the George Washington University.

Awards and technical achievements 
Zvenyach created SCOTUSServo, which tweets whenever the U.S. Supreme Court surreptitiously changes one of the opinions it has published online. As a consequence, the Supreme Court changed its policy on providing notice about changes to opinions.

He is the author of "Coding for Lawyers," which is intended for lawyers and teaches "regular expressions, Markdown, HTML, data types, using arrays, and coding in Python."

Zvenyach was named among the Federal 100 by FCW in 2017, was named Legal Hacker of the Year in 2014 by the DC Legal Hackers, awarded the FastCase 50 in 2014, and received the Exception Service award from the D.C. Bar Association in 2014.

References

1982 births
Living people
University of Wisconsin–Madison alumni
George Washington University faculty
George Washington University Law School alumni